Rosemary Nelson (née Magee; 4 September 1958 – 15 March 1999) was an Irish solicitor who was killed with a bomb planted in her car by an Ulster loyalist paramilitary group in 1999.

A bomb exploded under Nelson's car at her home in Lurgan, Northern Ireland. A loyalist paramilitary group calling itself the Red Hand Defenders claimed responsibility for the murder. Allegations that the British state security forces were involved in her killing led to a public inquiry. It found no evidence that state forces facilitated her murder, but could not exclude the possibility that individual members had helped the perpetrators. It said that the Royal Ulster Constabulary (RUC) failed to protect her and that she had been publicly threatened and assaulted by officers, which helped legitimize her as a target.

Legal career
Nelson obtained her law degree at Queen's University Belfast (QUB) School of Law. She worked with other solicitors for a number of years before opening her own practice in Lurgan in 1989. Nelson represented clients in a number of high-profile cases, including Michael Caraher, one of the South Armagh Snipers, as well as a republican paramilitary accused of killing two RUC officers. She also represented the Garvaghy Road Residents' Coalition in nearby Portadown in the long-running Drumcree conflict against the Orange Order and RUC.

Nelson was posthumously awarded the Train Foundation's Civil Courage Prize, which recognises "extraordinary heroes of conscience".

Assassination
Nelson claimed she had received death threats from members of the RUC as a result of her legal work. Some RUC officers made abusive and threatening remarks about Nelson to her clients, which became publicly known. In 1997, while approaching police lines in her capacity as legal representative of the Garvaghy Road Residents' Coalition, she was grabbed by an RUC officer and pulled into the middle of the police. Nelson reported to the Committee on the Administration of Justice that one of the officers said "Rosemary you Fenian fucker", spat in her face, and that the police pushed her around to the extent that she had bruises all over her arm, her right shoulder and her legs. The later Rosemary Nelson Inquiry concluded that her account of this incident was honest and truthful.

In 1998, the United Nations Special Rapporteur on the Independence of Judges and Solicitors, Param Cumaraswamy, noted threats from the RUC in his annual report, and stated in a television interview that he believed her life could be in danger. He made recommendations to the British government concerning threats from police against solicitors, which were not acted upon. Later that year, Nelson testified before a committee of the United States Congress investigating human rights in Northern Ireland, confirming that death threats had been made against her and her three children.

Nelson was assassinated, at the age of 40, by a car bomb outside her home in Lurgan, County Armagh, in 1999. The Red Hand Defenders claimed responsibility for the killing. She was survived by her husband and their three children.

Inquiry
In 2004, the Cory Collusion Inquiry recommended that the UK Government hold an inquiry into the circumstances of Nelson's death.

The resulting inquiry into her assassination opened at the Craigavon Civic Centre, Craigavon, County Armagh, in April 2005. In September 2006 the British Security Service MI5 announced it would be represented at the inquiry. This move provoked criticism from Nelson's family, who reportedly expressed concerns that MI5 would remove sensitive or classified information.

The results of the inquiry were published on 23 May 2011. The inquiry found no evidence that state agencies (the RUC, British Army and MI5) had "directly facilitated" her murder, but "could not exclude the possibility" that individual members had helped the perpetrators. It found that state agencies had failed to protect her and that some RUC intelligence about her had 'leaked'. Both of these, it said, increased the danger to her life. The report also stated that RUC officers had publicly abused and assaulted her in 1997, and made threatening remarks about her to her clients, which became publicly known. It concluded that this helped "legitimise her as a target in the eyes of loyalist terrorists".

See also
 Pat Finucane
 Robert Hamill
 Billy Wright

References

External links
 Inquiry website
 Socialist Democracy on the inquiry

1958 births
1999 deaths
People from Lurgan
Alumni of Queen's University Belfast
Solicitors from Northern Ireland
Human rights activists from Northern Ireland
Deaths by car bomb in Northern Ireland
People killed by loyalist paramilitaries
British women lawyers
Assassinated lawyers
20th-century women lawyers
1999 murders in the United Kingdom
1990s murders in Northern Ireland